"La dot" is a song performed by French-Malian singer Aya Nakamura. It was released on 19 December 2018. The song peaked at number 3 in France and number 32 in Wallonia. The song's music video garnered over 76 million views.

Charts

Weekly charts

Year-end charts

Certifications

References

2018 singles
2018 songs
Aya Nakamura songs
French-language songs
Songs written by Aya Nakamura